Rosic  (Rosic' ) is a word in some Slavic languages meaning  "Rus person". 

Rosic is also a surname. Notable persons with that surname include:

Branko Rosić, Serbian  musician and journalist, see Artistička radna akcija
Đoko Rosić (born 1932), Bulgarian-Serbian actor
Nikola Rosić (born 1984), Serbian volleyball player
Serbian Patriarch Varnava (Petar Rosic) (1880–1937), patriarch of the Serbian Orthodox Church

See also
 Rosich
 Rusich (disambiguation)
 Rosice